99 Neighbors is an American music group formed in Burlington, Vermont. It consists of seven members: Connor "Swank" Stankevich, Hank "HANKNATIVE" Collins, Sam Paulino, Aidan Ostby, Julian "Juju" Segar-Reid, Caleb "Somba" Hoh, and Jared Fier. The members comprise singers, rappers, and producers. Its music - a combination of hip hop, jazz, rock, and R&B influences - has drawn comparisons to Odd Future and Brockhampton.

History
Members Ostby, Paulino, and Collins graduated from South Burlington High School in South Burlington, Vermont. Paulino and Collins played on their high school's football and lacrosse teams together. After graduating from high school, Paulino and Collins shared an apartment in Burlington, where they began recording and producing music full-time collectively. Hoh and Segar-Reid grew up together in Burlington. After discovering they lived near one another, Paulino contacted Hoh about a collaborative opportunity using SoundCloud and formed a group. Calhoun Rawlings, then a Brother in law to Caleb Hoh (Samba,) married Hoh's Older Sister; would later befriend and manage the group as they booked shows and had friends in common. It is noted that around the time the group was formed the South End of Burlington Vermont despite Urban Renewal and upheaval, was a hotbed for the arts and Indie music. Other notable acts and groups that came from this time include Burlington's own Hanknative, Rapper Ricky Worthen, Gunnar Schumacher (Bro Safari), DJ Black Box, Broseph Stalin, and the Musical duo Brookly Hickey to name just a few. This Arts scene was primarily the Queen cities Old North End District as well as The South End in part to the venues Higher Ground, The Patrick Gymnasium, Arts Riot, and Indie or DIY venues such as The Lip & Jim's Basement.

Music release 
On January 1, 2019, 99 Neighbors released its first studio album, Television. It took the band two months to record the full-length debut album. In the same year, Fier became a DJ and started producing with the group.

In July 2019, the group signed a deal with Warner Records' manager Pat Corcoran, who formally managed Chance the Rapper.

Since signing with Warner Records, the group has released multiple singles. In October 2019, they released a song in collaboration with brass group Brasstracks and singer/songwriter PhiloSofie, titled "F**k No". The single has been streamed over 20 million times on Spotify. Other notable tracks by 99 Neighbors include "Fake Pods" and "Ripstick", which have amassed over 11 million streams on Spotify.

Discography

Albums and singles

References

Musical groups established in 2018
Musicians from Vermont
2018 establishments in Vermont